Inna Zhipulina is a Soviet sprint canoer who competed in the early 1980s. She won two silver medals in the K-4 500 m event at the ICF Canoe Sprint World Championships, earning them in 1981, 1982 and 1983.

References

Living people
Soviet female canoeists
Year of birth missing (living people)
Russian female canoeists
ICF Canoe Sprint World Championships medalists in kayak